John Wendell may refer to:
John Wendell (American football) (1885–1962), American football player
John Lansing Wendell (1785–1861), American judge
Captain John Wendell (died c. 1638), English merchant sailor who led the first English expedition to China

See also
Johnathan Wendel (born 1981), electronic sports player